Tim Ryan (born May 16, 1939) is a retired Canadian-born American sportscaster. Ryan was born in Winnipeg and raised in Toronto and attended De La Salle College (Toronto). His father, Joe, was general manager of three Canadian Football League teams in Winnipeg, Montreal and Edmonton and is an honoured member of both the Canadian Football Hall of Fame and Canada's Sports Hall of Fame.

Biography

Early life and career
Ryan was born in Winnipeg and raised in Toronto and attended De La Salle College (Toronto). His father, Joe, was general manager of three Canadian Football League teams in Winnipeg, Montreal and Edmonton and is an honoured member of both the Canadian Football Hall of Fame and Canada's Sports Hall of Fame.

In 1956, while attending high school, Ryan got his start in radio at CFRB in Toronto.

Ryan graduated from the University of Notre Dame in 1960 and took a job with newly formed Toronto TV station CFTO as an assistant sports director, where he called some games for the Toronto Maple Leafs Triple A minor league baseball club and the Toronto Marlboros junior hockey team as well as hosting late night repeats of Hamilton Tiger-Cats and Toronto Argonauts home games.

In 1966, Ryan was hired as the director of public relations for the expansion Oakland Seals of the NHL. He became the team's radio play-by-play announcer in 1967.

In 1969, Ryan moved to New York to work at WPIX as a news co-anchor and sportscaster. While in New York City, Ryan also called New York Rangers games on WOR-TV. He was also sports anchor on WNBC-TV 4 in New York in the mid-'70s.

First stint at NBC and New York Islanders
In 1972, Ryan left the Rangers to become the lead announcer for the NHL on NBC. Ryan would call three Stanley Cup Finals alongside Ted Lindsay. Ryan also called NFL games, and other sports for NBC.

While at CBS, Ryan also served as the play-by-play voice of the New York Islanders for seven seasons in the 1970s and early 1980s. Ryan had several partners, including George Michael and Ed Westfall.

CBS Sports and boxing announcer
In 1977, Ryan joined CBS. At CBS, Ryan called games for the NBA on CBS from 1977–1983, NFL on CBS from 1977–1993, College Football on CBS from 1996–97, and college basketball from 1982–1998. He also called alpine skiing at the 1992, 1994 and 1998 Olympic Winter Games. From 1978–97, Ryan was a CBS tennis commentator, calling nineteen U.S. Open Tennis Championships. When he called games for the NFL on CBS from 1977-93, he was paired with Johnny Morris from the 1978-85 seasons, Terry Bradshaw for the 1986 season, Joe Theismann for the 1987 season, Dan Jiggets for the 1988 season, Randy Cross for the 1989 season, Irv Cross for the 1990-91 seasons, and Matt Millen for the 1992-93 seasons.

Ryan called a majority of Chicago Bears games throughout the 1980s, including regular-season contests during the team's 1985 season en route to a victory in Super Bowl XX.

Ryan was also a lead boxing announcer during the 1970s and 1980s, for Mutual Radio, NBC, CBS, and fights shown on Closed-circuit television. Notable fights Ryan called include Muhammad Ali vs. Joe Frazier, Floyd Patterson vs. Oscar Bonavena, Bernard Hopkins vs. Glen Johnson, Thomas Hearns vs. Sugar Ray Leonard, Marvin Hagler vs. Sugar Ray Leonard, Ray Mancini vs. Duk Koo Kim and Mancini vs. Alexis Argüello. His color commentators for boxing were Angelo Dundee, Gil Clancy, Sugar Ray Leonard and Sean O’Grady. In 1986, Ryan won the Sam Taub Award for Excellence in Boxing Broadcast Journalism.

Fox Sports and second stint at NBC
Ryan's contract with CBS expired in 1998, allowing him to move to Fox and NBC. At Fox, Ryan covered NFL games and tennis; for NBC, he covered and tennis, alpine ski racing, equestrian events, and boxing. From 2004-2006, Ryan called college football and tennis for ESPN. (As a play-by-play broadcaster, Ryan is not to be confused with another Tim Ryan, who also called NFL games for Fox for many years, though mainly as a color  analyst.)

Ryan returned to NBC in 1998 and worked the 2000 Summer Olympics, 2002 Winter Olympics, 2004 Summer Olympics, 2006 Winter Olympics, 2008 Summer Olympics, and the 2010 Winter Olympics calling equestrian, rowing, and alpine skiing. He covered the equestrian events for the third time at the 2012 London Summer Olympics on NBC for a total of 10 Olympics in his 52-year career. He also hosted a nightly recap show on SIRIUS radio during the 2006 Wimbledon Championships.

Ryan served as the play-by-play announcer for NBC Sports coverage of Rowing and Flat Water Canoeing at the 2008 Summer Olympics.

On Someone Else's Nickel
Tim is the author of the memoir, On Someone Else's Nickel, recounting his 52-year career covering more than thirty different sports in more than twenty different countries on CBS, NBC and ESPN.  The book details not just the events he broadcast, but the people and the adventures surrounding them.

Personal life
In 1991, Ryan's wife, Lee Ryan, was diagnosed with Alzheimer's disease and died in 2002. Tim was a national board member of the Alzheimer's Association Public Policy Forum for eight years and still serves on an advisory board. He is a father of four children. Ryan is remarried and lives with his wife, Patricia, in Victoria, B.C.

References

External links
CBS News.com - 04-Mar-1998
Idaho Mountain Express - 11-Nov-2005 - Tim Ryan

1939 births
Living people
American television sports announcers
Boxing commentators
California Golden Seals announcers
Canadian sports announcers
College basketball announcers in the United States
College football announcers
Figure skating commentators
Minor League Baseball broadcasters
National Basketball Association broadcasters
National Football League announcers
National Hockey League broadcasters
New York Islanders announcers
New York Rangers announcers
NFL Europe broadcasters
Olympic Games broadcasters
People from Blaine County, Idaho
People from Toronto
People from Winnipeg
Skiing announcers
Tennis commentators
University of Notre Dame alumni
Women's college basketball announcers in the United States